Cotaruse District is one of the seventeen districts of the Aymaraes Province in Peru.

Geography 
Other mountains are listed below:

Ethnic groups 
The people in the district are mainly indigenous citizens of Quechua descent. Quechua is the language which the majority of the population (61.13%) learned to speak in childhood, while a minority (38.45%) of the residents learned to speak using the Spanish language (2007 Peru Census).

References

Districts of the Aymaraes Province
Districts of the Apurímac Region